Derek Harrison MBE (1927 – 22 December 2011) was a British police officer and former Superintendent Durham Constabulary. Harrison attended the University of Durham and gained an LLB in Law. He was President of the Durham Union for Easter term of 1952, and Editor of Palatinate in Easter and Michaelmas 1950. During his retirement, Harrison founded The Peeler (magazine).

References

Members of the Order of the British Empire
British police officers
1927 births
2011 deaths
Alumni of St Cuthbert's Society, Durham
Presidents of the Durham Union